Gloria is an American sitcom television series and a spin-off of Archie Bunker's Place that aired Sundays at 8:30 p.m. (EST) on CBS from September 26, 1982, to April 10, 1983. The series stars Sally Struthers reprising her role as Gloria Stivic, the daughter of Archie Bunker on All in the Family.

Synopsis
The set-up of the show was that Gloria had been left with loose ends after her husband, Michael "Meathead" Stivic (who did not appear in the new series), left her for one of his students and moved to a nudist commune. Gloria, to be closer to her now-widowed father, decided to move with her young son, Joey (played by Christian Jacobs), and pick up the pieces of her life by returning to New York City from California.  However, Gloria, not wanting to raise Joey in the city, decides to take a job as an assistant to two veterinarians in the fictitious upstate town of Fox Ridge. The veterinarians were played by Burgess Meredith and Jo de Winter; the character played by Meredith was also Gloria's landlord.

CBS chose not to renew Gloria for a second season, despite the fact that the show ranked 18th for the season, making it one of the few spin-offs of All in the Family not to have a successful run.

Pilot
CBS rejected Glorias original pilot which featured a brief cameo by Carroll O'Connor as Archie Bunker dropping off Gloria and Joey at Dr. Adams' clinic and residence. It was instead aired as a backdoor pilot episode within Archie Bunker's Place. This pilot was written by veteran All in the Family and Archie Bunker's Place writers Pat Shea and Harriett Weiss and Archie Bunker's Place producer and close Carroll O'Connor associate Joe Gannon who co-created, wrote and produced the pilot. They were replaced by former WKRP in Cincinnati writers Steve Marshall and Dan Guntzelman (who would later find success writing and producing the long-running ABC sitcom Growing Pains as well as creating and producing its spin-off show, Just the Ten of Us).

The show's production was moved from CBS Television City to Universal Studios. According to a December 1982 feature interview with Sally Struthers in TV Guide, this did not sit well with Carroll O'Connor who, with the rest of the Archie Bunker's Place production staff, was effectively shut out of the production of Gloria (even Norman Lear, who created All in the Family and had some hand in all of its other spin-offs, had no credited involvement in Gloria). After this, O'Connor chose to be uninvolved in the retooled pilot and series. The characters of Dr. Jim Waynewrite and Ben the handyman were dropped when Marshall and Guntzelman's second pilot was made, which went to series. In the second pilot, Joey adopted a black dog that he named Archie after his grandfather, which O'Connor was said to be less than thrilled about, according to the same 1982 TV Guide article. In the original pilot, actress Jo de Winter's character, Maggie Lawrence, is an assistant to Dr. Adams. In the second pilot and the series, Maggie Lawrence is a veterinarian and Dr. Adams' partner in the clinic.

Cast
Sally Struthers as Gloria Bunker Stivic
Burgess Meredith as Dr. Willard Adams
Jo de Winter as Dr. Maggie Lawrence
Christian Jacobs as Joey Stivic
Lou Richards as Clark V. Uhley, Jr.

Episodes

Backdoor pilot (1982)
A backdoor pilot, entitled "Gloria: The First Day", was originally aired as the 29th and final episode of the third season of Archie Bunker's Place in the syndication package.  It aired on TV Land on March 12, 2003.

Season 1 (1982–83)

References

External links
 

All in the Family
1982 American television series debuts
1983 American television series endings
1980s American sitcoms
American television spin-offs
CBS original programming
English-language television shows
Television series by Sony Pictures Television
Television shows set in New York (state)